William Wallen may refer to:

 William Wallén (born 1991), Swedish ice hockey forward
 William Wallen Sr. (architect and surveyor) (1790–1873), English architect and surveyor in London
 William Wallen Jr. (architect and surveyor) (1817–1891), English architect and surveyor in London
 William Wallen (architect) (1807–1888), English architect who practiced in London and Huddersfield, Yorkshire

See also
Wallen (disambiguation)